Lì (莉) is a  Chinese surname, among the Hui people of Yunnan Province. However the Baijiaxing (百家姓) does not have the surname "莉" as it is not an ethnic Han Chinese family.

References

Surnames
Chinese-language surnames
Individual Chinese surnames